Benzaldehyde oxime is an organic compound with the formula C7H7NO. Benzaldehyde oxime can be synthesized from benzaldehyde and hydroxylamine hydrochloride in presence of a base. The reaction at room temperature in methanol gives 9% E-isomer and 82% Z-isomer.

Reactions

Benzaldehyde oxime undergoes Beckmann rearrangement to form benzamide, catalyzed by nickel salts or photocatalyzed by BODIPY. Its dehydration yields benzonitrile. It can be hydrolyzed to regenerate benzaldehyde.

It reacts with N-chlorosuccinimide in DMF to form benzohydroximoyl chloride, in which chlorine replaces hydrogen on the carbon attached to the nitrogen in benzaldehyde oxime.

References

Oximes